Borteyman is a community in the Kpone Katamanso district in the Greater Accra region of Ghana.

Facilities

Sports complex 
It is the location of the $145 million sports complex which would be used for the 2023 African Games which is known as the Borteyman Sports Complex. The sports complex has the following facilities: 400-metre 6-lane athletics warm-up track with playing field for football; Washrooms for male and female; spectators stand for about 500 people; A thousand-seater competition swimming pool, collapsible to five hundred (500) seater. 8-lane competition swimming; 8-Lane warm-up swimming Pool; five hundred seater (500) temporary dome (handball, judo, karate, taekwondo, etc.); a thousand-seater (1,000) multi-purpose sports hall (badminton, boxing, volleyball, weightlifting, etc.); five (5) tennis courts complex which includes a thousand-seater (1,000) center court covered spectator stand with a VVIP viewing stand) and space for children's playground. Nana Akufo-Addo cut the sod for the commencement for the construction of the sports complex.

Housing project 
It is also the location of the affordable housing project by the State Housing Company Limited which consists of five blocks with 72 units.

References 

Communities in Ghana
Greater Accra Region